The 22nd Hollywood Film Awards were held on November 4, 2018. The ceremony took place at The Beverly Hilton Hotel in Santa Monica, California, and was hosted by Awkwafina.

Winners
Hollywood Career Achievement Award Nicole Kidman
Hollywood Actor Award Hugh Jackman – The Front Runner
Hollywood Supporting Actor Award Timothée Chalamet – Beautiful Boy
Hollywood Actress Award Glenn Close – The Wife
Hollywood Supporting Actress Award Rachel Weisz – The Favourite
Hollywood Breakout Actor Award John David Washington – BlacKkKlansman
Hollywood Breakout Actress Award Amandla Stenberg – The Hate U Give
Hollywood Breakthrough Director Award Felix Van Groeningen – Beautiful Boy
New Hollywood Award Yalitza Aparicio – Roma
Hollywood Ensemble Award Viggo Mortensen, Mahershala Ali, and Linda Cardellini – Green Book
Hollywood Breakout Ensemble Award Constance Wu, Henry Golding, Michelle Yeoh, Gemma Chan, Lisa Lu, Awkwafina, Ken Jeong, Sonoya Mizuno, Chris Pang, Jimmy O. Yang, Ronny Chieng, Remi Hii, and Nico Santos – Crazy Rich Asians 
Hollywood Film Award Black Panther
Hollywood Animation Award Incredibles 2
Hollywood Documentary Award Believer
Hollywood Director Award Damien Chazelle – First Man
Hollywood Screenwriter Award Peter Farrelly, Nick Vallelonga, and Brian Currie – Green Book
Hollywood Cinematography Award Matthew Libatique – A Star Is Born
Hollywood Film Composer Award Justin Hurwitz – First Man
Hollywood Editor Award Tom Cross – First Man
Hollywood Visual Effects Award Dan DeLeeuw, Kelly Port, Russell Earl, and Dan Sudick – Avengers: Infinity War
Hollywood Costume Design Award Sandy Powell – The Favourite
Hollywood Make-Up & Hair Styling Award Jenny Shircore, Sarah Kelly, and Hannah Edwards – Mary Queen of Scots
Hollywood Production Design Award Hannah Beachler – Black Panther
Hollywood Sound Award Erik Aadahl, Ethan Van der Ryn, and Brandon Proctor – A Quiet Place

References

External links
 

Hollywood
2018 in California
Hollywood Film Awards
2018 in American cinema